Erla Þorsteinsdóttir (born 8 March 1978) is an Icelandic former basketball player. She was a key player on the Keflavík team that won six Icelandic championships and seven Icelandic basketball cups during her stay there. In 2001 she was voted as one of the twelve players on the team of the 20th century. She was named the Úrvalsdeild Domestic Player of the Year in 2000.

Early life
Erla was born in Keflavík in 1978. She started practicing basketball with Keflavík at the age of 11. She was a promising golfer in her youth and was a member of the Icelandic junior national golf teams. Following her retirement from basketball due to injuries, she returned to practicing golf.

National team career
Between 1995 and 2004, Erla played 34 games for the Icelandic national basketball team.

References

1978 births
Living people
Erla Þorsteinsdóttir
Erla Þorsteinsdóttir
Erla Þorsteinsdóttir
Erla Þorsteinsdóttir